M54 or M-54 may be:

Roads:
 M54 motorway, a motorway in England also known as the Telford Motorway
 M-54 (Michigan highway), a state highway in Michigan
 M54 (Cape Town), a Metropolitan Route in Cape Town, South Africa
 M54 (Johannesburg), a Metropolitan Route in Johannesburg, South Africa

Vehicles:
 BMW M54, a 2000 automobile engine
 M54 (truck), a heavy truck used by the United States armed forces

Astronomy:
 Messier 54, a globular cluster in the constellation Sagittarius